The 2015–16 Oklahoma City Thunder season was the 8th season of the franchise in Oklahoma City and the 50th in the National Basketball Association (NBA), and the first under head coach Billy Donovan. After coming just short of making the playoffs the previous season, the Thunder won the Northwest Division and clinched the third seed in the Western Conference. In the playoffs, the Thunder defeated the Dallas Mavericks in five games in the First Round, and the San Antonio Spurs in six games in the Semifinals (which was also Tim Duncan's final NBA game) before reaching the Western Conference Finals for the fourth time in a span of six seasons, but were eliminated by the defending NBA champion Golden State Warriors in seven games after leading the series 3–1.

After almost pulling what would've been one of the biggest upsets in professional sports history over the 73–9 Warriors, the Thunder missed out on what would’ve been their first Finals appearance since 2012. The Warriors would go on to lose in seven games against the Cleveland Cavaliers in the NBA Finals after they too led the series 3–1.

After the season, Kevin Durant controversially left the team in free agency for the Golden State Warriors.

Previous season
The Thunder finished the 2014–15 season 45–37 to finish in second place in the Northwest Division, ninth in the Western Conference and failed to qualify for the playoffs. This marks the second season that the Thunder failed to qualify for the playoffs since moving to Oklahoma City. Following the season, head coach Scott Brooks was fired on April 22, 2015.

Offseason

Draft picks

The Thunder had their own first-round pick and second-round pick entering the draft. The Thunder ended 2015 NBA Draft night with Murray State guard Cameron Payne and Kentucky center Dakari Johnson.

Trades
On June 25, the Thunder traded Jeremy Lamb to the Charlotte Hornets in exchange for Luke Ridnour and a future 2016 second-round pick in an effort for payroll relief. Lamb was originally acquired in the James Harden trade back in 2012. Five days later, Ridnour was traded again along with cash considerations to the Toronto Raptors in exchange for the draft rights to Tomislav Zubcic and a trade exception.

On July 14, the Thunder traded Perry Jones, a 2019 second-round pick, and cash considerations to the Boston Celtics in exchange for a protected 2018 second-round pick and a trade exception in another effort for payroll relief. By trading Jones' $2 million, the Thunder cleared $5 million in luxury tax payments.

Free agency

For this offseason, free agency began on July 1st, 2015 while the July moratorium ended on July 7. Enes Kanter and Kyle Singler were set to hit restricted free agency. On July 1, it was reported that Kyle Singler agreed to a five-year, nearly $25 million deal to stay with the Thunder, which he later signed on July 9. On July 9, Enes Kanter signed a four-year, $70 million deal with the Portland Trail Blazers. However on July 12, the Thunder exercised its right of first refusal and matched the Trail Blazer's offer sheet to re-sign Kanter.

On July 30, Josh Huestis signed a rookie deal with the Thunder. Huestis was originally selected 29th overall in the 2014 NBA Draft but became the first "domestic draft-and-stash" after working out a predraft arrangement with the Thunder to not sign his guaranteed rookie-scale deal. Huestis spent the 2014-15 NBA season with the Oklahoma City Blue.

Front office and coaching changes
After the Thunder failed to make the 2014 NBA Playoffs, head coach Scott Brooks was fired on April 22, 2015 after seven seasons with the team. Brooks was named head coach of the Thunder on April 15, 2009 taking over for P.J. Carlesimo after serving as interim head coach during the 2008–09 season. Brooks accumulated a 338-207 (.620) record, named the 2009–10 season NBA Coach of the Year, made three appearances in the Western Conference Finals (2011, 2012, 2014) and an appearance in the 2012 NBA Finals.

On April 30, the Thunder hired Billy Donovan, formerly with the Florida Gators, as head coach. Donovan became the third head coach of the Thunder since moving to Oklahoma City. Donovan led the Gators to two national championships, four trips to the Final Four, and accumulated a 467-186 (.715) record.

On June 29, the Thunder announced Monty Williams, Maurice Cheeks, and Anthony Grant as assistant coaches and Billy Schmidt as quality control coach. Williams joins the Thunder after serving five seasons as the head coach of the New Orleans Pelicans leading the Pelicans to a playoff appearance in the 2014–15 season. Cheeks re-joined the Thunder after serving as the head coach of the Detroit Pistons during the 2013–14 season. Grant joins the Thunder after serving six seasons as the head coach of the Alabama Crimson Tide. Schmidt joins the Thunder after serving last season under Billy Donovan at the University of Florida.

Roster

Roster notes
 Enes Kanter changed his jersey number to #11 while Josh Huestis chose Kanter's former jersey number #34.

Salaries

All 2015-16 salaries.
‡ Waived with guaranteed money

Staff

Standings

Conference

Division

Game log

Preseason

|- style="background:#bfb;"
| 1
| October 7
| @ Minnesota
|  
| Serge Ibaka (18)
| Russell Westbrook (8)
| Russell Westbrook (13)
| Target Center8,601
| 1–0
|- style="background:#bfb;"
| 2
| October 9
| Fenerbahçe
|  
| Dion Waiters (19)
| Steven Adams (8)
| Durant & Westbrook (5)
| Chesapeake Energy ArenaN/A
| 2–0
|- style="background:#bfb;"
| 3
| October 13
| Dallas
|   
| Russell Westbrook (19)
| Enes Kanter (11)
| D. J. Augustin (8)
| BOK Center17,978
| 3–0
|- style="background:#fbb;"
| 4
| October 16
| @ Memphis
|   
| Anthony Morrow (16)
| Roberson & Adams (7)
| Cameron Payne (6)
| FedEx Forum14,996
| 3–1
|- style="background:#bfb;"
| 5
| October 18
| Denver
|  
| Kevin Durant (23)
| Enes Kanter (11)
| Russell Westbrook (12)
| Chesapeake Energy ArenaN/A
| 4–1
|- style="background:#bfb;"
| 6
| October 20
| @ Utah
|  
| Kevin Durant (29)
| Adams & Westbrook (10)
| Russell Westbrook (10)
| Energy Solutions Arena17,806
| 5–1

Regular season

|- style="background:#cfc;"
| 1
| October 28
| San Antonio
|  
| Russell Westbrook (33)
| Enes Kanter (16)
| Russell Westbrook (10)
| Chesapeake Energy Arena18,203
| 1–0
|-style="background:#cfc;"
|2
|October 30
| @ Orlando 
|  
| Russell Westbrook (48)
| Durant & Ibaka (12)
| Russell Westbrook (8)
| Amway Center 18,846
| 2–0

|- style="background:#cfc;"
| 3
| November 1
|  Denver
|   
| Kevin Durant (25)
| Enes Kanter (10)
| Russell Westbrook (8)
| Chesapeake Energy Arena 18,203
| 3–0
|- style="background:#fcc;"
| 4
| November 2
| @ Houston
|  
| Kevin Durant (29)
| Serge Ibaka (14)
| Russell Westbrook (11)
| Toyota Center17,224
| 3–1
|- style="background:#fcc;"
| 5
| November 4
|  Toronto
| 
| Kevin Durant (27)
| Durant & Adams (7)
| Russell Westbrook (16)
| Chesapeake Energy Arena18,203
| 3–2
|- style="background:#fcc;"
| 6
| November 5
|@ Chicago
| 
| Kevin Durant (33)
| Enes Kanter (8)
| Russell Westbrook (10)
| United Center21,861
| 3–3
|- style="background:#cfc;"
| 7
| November 8
| Phoenix
| 
| Kevin Durant (32)
| Kevin Durant (11)
| Russell Westbrook (13)
| Chesapeake Energy Arena18,203
| 4–3
|- style="background:#cfc;"
| 8
| November 10
|  @Washington
|   
| Dion Waiters (25)
| Russell Westbrook (11)
| Russell Westbrook (11)
| Verizon Center20,356
| 5–3
|- style="background:#cfc;"
| 9
| November 13
| Philadelphia
|  
| Russell Westbrook (21)
| Russell Westbrook (17)
| Russell Westbrook (11)
| Chesapeake Energy Arena18,203
| 6–3
|- style="background:#fcc;"
| 10
| November 15
| Boston
|   
| Russell Westbrook (27)
| Serge Ibaka (10)
| Russell Westbrook (5)
| Chesapeake Energy Arena18,203
| 6–4
|- style="background:#fcc;"
|11
| November 16
| @ Memphis
|  
| Russell Westbrook (40)
| Serge Ibaka (9)
| Russell Westbrook (14)
| FedEx Forum17,270
| 6–5
|- style="background:#cfc;"
| 12
| November 18
|  New Orleans
|  
| Russell Westbrook (43)
| Enes Kanter (11)
| Russell Westbrook (8)
| Chesapeake Energy Arena18,203
| 7–5
|- style="background:#fcc;"
| 13
| November 20
| New York
| 
| Russell Westbrook (34)
| Enes Kanter (13)
| Russell Westbrook (7)
| Chesapeake Energy Arena18,203
| 7–6
|- style="background:#cfc;"
| 14
| November 22
| Dallas
|   
| Russell Westbrook (31)
| Serge Ibaka (9)
| Russell Westbrook (11)
| Chesapeake Energy Arena18,203
| 8–6
|- style="background:#cfc;"
| 15
| November 23
| @ Utah
| 
| Kevin Durant (27)
| Russell Westbrook (7)
| Russell Westbrook (9)
| Vivint Smart Home Arena19,911
| 9–6
|- style="background:#cfc;"
| 16
| November 25
| Brooklyn
| 
| Kevin Durant (30)
| Enes Kanter (9)
| Russell Westbrook (13)
| Chesapeake Energy Arena18,203
| 10–6
|- style="background:#cfc;"
| 17
| November 27
| Detroit
|  
| Kevin Durant (34)
| Durant & Adams (13)
| Kevin Durant (5)
| Chesapeake Energy Arena18,203
| 11–6
|- style="background:#fcc;"
| 18
| November 30
| @ Atlanta
| 
| Russell Westbrook (34)
| Russell Westbrook (11)
| Russell Westbrook (7)
| Philips Arena17,768
| 11–7

|- style="background:#fcc;"
| 19
| December 3
| @ Miami
|   
| Durant & Westbrook (25)
| Durant & Roberson (9)
| Russell Westbrook (7)
| American Airlines Arena19,600
| 11–8
|- style="background:#cfc;"
| 20
| December 6
| Sacramento
| 
| Kevin Durant (20)
| Steven Adams (12)
| Russell Westbrook (10)
| Chesapeake Energy Arena18,203
| 12–8
|- style="background:#cfc;"
| 21
| December 8
| @ Memphis
|   
| Kevin Durant (32)
| Kevin Durant (10)
| Russell Westbrook (16)
| FedEx Forum16,415
| 13–8
|- style="background:#cfc;"
| 22
| December 10
| Atlanta
|   
| Kevin Durant (25)
| Kevin Durant (12)
| Durant & Westbrook (10)
| Chesapeake Energy Arena18,203
| 14–8
|- style="background:#cfc;"
| 23
| December 11
| @ Utah
|   
| Russell Westbrook (24)
| Durant & Ibaka (8)
| Russell Westbrook (7)
| Energy Solutions Arena 19,911
| 15–8
|- style="background:#cfc;"
| 24
| December 13
| Utah
|   
| Kevin Durant (31)
| Russell Westbrook (11)
| Kevin Durant (6)
| Chesapeake Energy Arena18,203
| 16–8
|- style="background:#cfc;"
| 25
| December 16
| Portland
|   
| Kevin Durant (24)
| Enes Kanter (13)
| Russell Westbrook (5)
| Chesapeake Energy Arena18,203
| 17–8
|- style="background:#fcc;"
| 26
| December 17
| @ Cleveland
|  
| Kevin Durant (27)
| Serge Ibaka (9)
| Russell Westbrook (10)
| Quicken Loans Arena20,562
| 17–9
|- style="background:#cfc;"
| 27
| December 19
|  L.A. Lakers
|   
| Kevin Durant (22)
| Enes Kanter (14)
| Russell Westbrook (11)
| Chesapeake Energy Arena18,203
| 18–9
|- style="background:#cfc;"
| 28
| December 21
| @ L.A. Clippers
| 
| Russell Westbrook (33)
| Steven Adams (11)
| Durant, Westbrook (7)
| Staples Center19,415
| 19–9
|- style="background:#cfc;"
| 29
| December 23
| @ L.A. Lakers
|   
| Russell Westbrook (23)
| Enes Kanter (10)
| Russell Westbrook (8)
| Staples Center18,997
| 20–9
|- style="background:#fcc;"
| 30
| December 25
| Chicago
|   
| Kevin Durant (29)
| Enes Kanter (11)
| Russell Westbrook (8)
| Chesapeake Energy Arena18,203
| 20–10
|- style="background:#cfc;"
| 31
| December 27
| Denver
| 
| Russell Westbrook (30)
| Russell Westbrook (9)
| Russell Westbrook (12)
| Chesapeake Energy Arena18,203
| 21–10
|- style="background:#cfc;"
| 32
| December 29
| Milwaukee
| 
| Russell Westbrook (27)
| Enes Kanter (8)
| Kevin Durant (8)
| Chesapeake Energy Arena18,203
| 22–10
|- style="background:#cfc;"
| 33
| December 31
| Phoenix
|   
| Russell Westbrook (36)
| Steven Adams (8)
| Russell Westbrook (12)
| Chesapeake Energy Arena18,203
| 23–10

|- style="background:#cfc;"
| 34
| January 2
| @ Charlotte
|   
| Kevin Durant (29)
| Kevin Durant (11)
| Russell Westbrook (7)
| Time Warner Cable Arena19,387
| 24–10
|- style="background:#fcc;"
| 35
| January 4
| Sacramento
| 
| Serge Ibaka (25)
| Steven Adams (10)
| Russell Westbrook (15) 
| Chesapeake Energy Arena18,203
| 24–11
|- style="background:#cfc;"
| 36
| January 6
| Memphis
|  
| Kevin Durant (26)
| Kevin Durant (17)
| Russell Westbrook (7)
| Chesapeake Energy Arena18,203
| 25–11
|- style="background:#cfc;"
| 37
| January 8
| @ L.A. Lakers
|  
| Russell Westbrook (36)
| Russell Westbrook (12)
| Russell Westbrook (7)
| Staples Center18,997
| 26–11
|- style="background:#fcc;"
| 38
| January 10
| @ Portland
|   
| Kevin Durant (28)
| Steven Adams (10)
| Russell Westbrook (15)
| Moda Center19,393
| 26–12
|- style="background:#cfc;"
| 39
| January 12
| @ Minnesota
| 
| Kevin Durant (30)
| Serge Ibaka (8)
| Russell Westbrook (11)
| Target Center14,791
| 27–12
|- style="background:#cfc;"
| 40
| January 13
| Dallas
|  
| Kevin Durant (29)
| Serge Ibaka (11)
| Russell Westbrook (8)
| Chesapeake Energy Arena18,203
| 28–12
|- style="background:#cfc;"
| 41
| January 15
| Minnesota
|   
| Kevin Durant (21)
| Russell Westbrook (11)
| Russell Westbrook (10)
| Chesapeake Energy Arena18,203
| 29–12
|- style="background:#cfc;"
| 42
| January 17
| Miami
|   
| Kevin Durant (24)
| Kevin Durant & Russell Westbrook (10)
| Russell Westbrook (15)
| Chesapeake Energy Arena18,203
| 30–12
|- style="background:#cfc;"
| 43
| January 19
| @ Denver
|  
| Kevin Durant (30)
| Kevin Durant (12)
| Russell Westbrook (12)
| Pepsi Center12,844
| 31–12
|- style="background:#cfc;"
| 44
| January 20
| Charlotte
|  
| Kevin Durant (26)
| Steven Adams (10)
| Russell Westbrook (15)
| Chesapeake Energy Arena18,203
| 32–12
|- style="background:#cfc;"
| 45
| January 22
| @ Dallas
|   
| Kevin Durant (24)
| Nick Collison (11)
|Kevin Durant & Russell Westbrook (7)
| American Airlines Center20,284
| 33–12
|- style="background:#fcc;"
| 46
| January 24
| @ Brooklyn
|  
| Kevin Durant (32)
| Russell Westbrook (11)
| Kevin Durant & Russell Westbrook (7)
| Barclays Center16,019
| 33–13
|- style="background:#cfc;"
| 47
| January 26
| @ New York
| 
| Kevin Durant (44)
| Serge Ibaka (17)
| Russell Westbrook (10)
| Madison Square Garden19,812
| 34–13
|-style="background:#cfc;"
|48
|January 27
| @ Minnesota
|
| Kevin Durant (27)
| Enes Kanter (10)
| Russell Westbrook (15)
| Target Center 13,337
|35–13
|-style="background:#cfc;"
|49
|January 29
| Houston
|
| Kevin Durant (33)
| Kevin Durant (12)
| Russell Westbrook (14)
| Chesapeake Energy Arena  18,203
|36–13

|- style="background:#cfc;"
| 50
| February 1
|  Washington
|  
| Kevin Durant (28)
| Russell Westbrook (13)
| Russell Westbrook (11)
| Chesapeake Energy Arena18,203
| 37–13
|- style="background:#cfc;"
| 51
| February 3
| Orlando
|   
| Kevin Durant (37)
| Russell Westbrook (19)
| Russell Westbrook (14)
| Chesapeake Energy Arena18,203
| 38–13
|- style="background:#fcc;"
| 52
| February 6
| @ Golden State
|   
| Kevin Durant (40)
| Enes Kanter (15)
| Russell Westbrook (12)
| Oracle Arena19,596
| 38–14
|- style="background:#cfc;"
| 53
| February 8
| @ Phoenix
|  
| Kevin Durant (32)
| Russell Westbrook (8)
| Russell Westbrook (8)
| Talking Stick Resort Arena16,316
| 39–14
|- style="background:#cfc;"
| 54
| February 11
| New Orleans
|   
| Durant & Westbrook (23)
| Enes Kanter (12)
| Russell Westbrook (10)
| Chesapeake Energy Arena18,203
| 40–14
|- align="center"
|colspan="9" bgcolor="#bbcaff"|All-Star Break
|- style="background:#fcc;"
| 55
| February 19
|  Indiana
|  
| Kevin Durant (31)
| Serge Ibaka (11)
| Russell Westbrook (18)
| Chesapeake Energy Arena18,203
| 40–15
|- style="background:#fcc;"
| 56
| February 21
| Cleveland
|   
| Kevin Durant (26)
| Adams & Westbrook (9)
| Russell Westbrook (11)
| Chesapeake Energy Arena18,203
| 40–16
|- style="background:#cfc;"
| 57
| February 24
| @ Dallas
|  
| Durant & Westbrook (24)
| Enes Kanter (9)
| Russell Westbrook (13)
| American Airlines Center19,805
| 41–16
|- style="background:#fcc;"
| 58
| February 25
| @ New Orleans
|   
| Russell Westbrook (44)
| Kevin Durant (14)
| Russell Westbrook (9)
| Smoothie King Center16,974
| 41–17
|- style="background:#fcc;"
| 59
| February 27
| Golden State
|  
| Kevin Durant (37)
| Serge Ibaka (20)
| Russell Westbrook (13)
| Chesapeake Energy Arena18,203
| 41–18
|- style="background:#cfc;"
| 60
| February 29
| @ Sacramento
|  
| Kevin Durant (27)
| Russell Westbrook (13)
| Russell Westbrook (15)
| Sleep Train Arena17,317
| 42–18

|- style="background:#fcc;"
| 61
| March 2
| @ L.A. Clippers
| 
| Kevin Durant (30)
| Durant & Ibaka (11)
| Russell Westbrook (12)
| Staples Center19,304
| 42–19
|- style="background:#fcc;"
| 62
| March 3
| @ Golden State
| 
| Kevin Durant (32)
| André Roberson (11)
| Kevin Durant (9)
| Oracle Arena19,596
| 42–20
|- style="background:#cfc;"
| 63
| March 6
| @ Milwaukee
|   
| Kevin Durant (32)
| Enes Kanter (12)
| Russell Westbrook (11)
| BMO Harris Bradley Center16,565
| 43–20
|- style="background:#cfc;"
| 64
| March 9
| L.A. Clippers
| 
| Kevin Durant (30)
| Kevin Durant (12)
| Russell Westbrook (20)
| Chesapeake Energy Arena18,203
| 44–20
|- style="background:#fcc;"
| 65
| March 11
| Minnesota
| 
| Kevin Durant (28)
| Steven Adams (13)
| Russell Westbrook (8) 
| Chesapeake Energy Arena18,203
| 44–21
|- style="background:#fcc;"
| 66
| March 12
| @ San Antonio
| 
| Kevin Durant (28)
| Serge Ibaka (12)
| Kevin Durant (8)
| AT&T Center18,418
| 44–22
|- style="background:#cfc;"
| 67
| March 14
| Portland
|   
| Enes Kanter (26)
| Russell Westbrook (10)
| Russell Westbrook (16)
| Chesapeake Energy Arena18,203
| 45–22
|- style="background:#cfc;"
| 68
| March 16
| @ Boston
| 
| Kevin Durant (28)
| Enes Kanter (12)
| Kevin Durant (9)
| TD Garden18,624
| 46–22
|- style="background:#cfc;"
| 69
| March 18
| @ Philadelphia
| 
| Kevin Durant (26)
| Russell Westbrook (15)
| Russell Westbrook (10)
| Wells Fargo Center20,388
| 47–22
|- style="background:#cfc;"
| 70
| March 19
| @ Indiana
|  
| Kevin Durant (33)
| Kevin Durant (12)
| Russell Westbrook (11)
| Bankers Life Fieldhouse18,165
| 48–22
|- style="background:#cfc;"
| 71
| March 22
| Houston
|  
| Kevin Durant (23)
| Russell Westbrook (13)
| Russell Westbrook (15)
| Chesapeake Energy Arena18,203
| 49–22
|- style="background:#cfc;"
| 72
| March 24
| Utah
| 
| Kevin Durant (20)
| Kevin Durant (8)
| Russell Westbrook (9)
| Chesapeake Energy Arena18,203
| 50–22
|- style="background:#cfc;"
| 73
| March 26
| San Antonio
| 
| Kevin Durant (31)
| Kevin Durant (10)
| Russell Westbrook (8)
| Chesapeake Energy Arena18,203
| 51–22
|- style="background:#cfc;"
| 74
| March 28
| @ Toronto
| 
| Kevin Durant (34)
| Russell Westbrook (11)
| Russell Westbrook (12)
| Air Canada Centre19,800
| 52–22
|- style="background:#fcc;"
| 75
| March 29
| @ Detroit
| 
| Russell Westbrook (24)
| Enes Kanter (14)
| Russell Westbrook (6)
| The Palace of Auburn Hills 18,201
| 52–23
|- style="background:#cfc;"
| 76
| March 31
| L.A. Clippers
| 
| Kevin Durant (31)
| Ibaka (9)
| Russell Westbrook (11)
| Chesapeake Energy Arena18,203
| 53–23

|- style="background:#fcc;"
| 77
| April 3
| @ Houston
|   
| Kevin Durant (33)
| Russell Westbrook (12)
| Russell Westbrook (8)
| Toyota Center18,462
| 53–24
|- style="background:#cfc;"
| 78
| April 5
| @ Denver
|  
| Kevin Durant (26)
| Russell Westbrook (14)
| Russell Westbrook (12)
| Pepsi Center12,611
| 54–24
|- style="background:#fcc;"
| 79
| April 6
| @ Portland
|  
| Enes Kanter (33)
| Enes Kanter (20)
| Cameron Payne (6)
| Moda Center19,399
| 54–25
|- style="background:#fcc;"
| 80
| April 9
| @ Sacramento
|  
| Kevin Durant (31)
| Ibaka & Adams (8)
| Russell Westbrook (10)
| Sleep Train Arena17,317
| 54–26
|- style="background:#cfc;"
| 81
| April 11
| L.A. Lakers
|  
| Kevin Durant (34)
| Steven Adams (15)
| Russell Westbrook (14)
| Chesapeake Energy Arena18,203
| 55–26
|- style="background:#fcc;"
| 82
| April 12
| @ San Antonio
|   
| Adams, Waiters, Payne & Kanter (17)
| Enes Kanter (16)
| Cameron Payne (7)
| AT&T Center18,765
|55–27

Playoffs

|- style="background:#cfc;"
| 1
| April 16
| Dallas
| 
| Russell Westbrook (24)
| Enes Kanter (11)
| Russell Westbrook (11)
| Chesapeake Energy Arena18,203
| 1–0
|- style="background:#fcc;"
| 2
| April 18
| Dallas
| 
| Kevin Durant (21)
| Russell Westbrook (14)
| Russell Westbrook (6)
| Chesapeake Energy Arena18,203
|1–1
|- style="background:#cfc;"
| 3
| April 21
| @ Dallas
| 
| Kevin Durant (34)
| Enes Kanter (8)
| Russell Westbrook (15)
| American Airlines Center 20,150
| 2–1
|-style="background:#cfc;"
| 4
| April 23
| @ Dallas
| 
| Enes Kanter (28)
| Roberson, Adams (8)
| Russell Westbrook (15)
| American Airlines Center 20,516
|3–1
|- style="background:#cfc;"
| 5
| April 25
| Dallas
| 
| Russell Westbrook (36)
| Russell Westbrook (12)
| Russell Westbrook (9)
| Chesapeake Energy Arena18,203
| 4–1

|- style="background:#fcc;"
| 1
| April 30
| @ San Antonio
|
| Serge Ibaka (19)
| Serge Ibaka (10)
| Russell Westbrook (9)
| AT&T Center18,418
| 0–1
|- style="background:#cfc;"
| 2
| May 2
| @ San Antonio
|
| Russell Westbrook (29)
| Steven Adams (17)
| Russell Westbrook (10)
| AT&T Center18,418
| 1–1
|- style="background:#fcc;"
| 3
| May 6
| San Antonio
| 
| Russell Westbrook (31)
| Steven Adams (11)
| Russell Westbrook (8)
| Chesapeake Energy Arena18,203
| 1–2
|- style="background:#cfc;"
| 4
| May 8
| San Antonio
| 
| Kevin Durant (41)
| Steven Adams (10)
| Russell Westbrook (15)
| Chesapeake Energy Arena18,203
| 2–2
|- style="background:#cfc;"
| 5
| May 10
| @ San Antonio
| 
| Russell Westbrook (35)
| Enes Kanter (13)
| Russell Westbrook (9)
| AT&T Center18,418
| 3–2
|- style="background:#cfc;"
| 6
| May 12
| San Antonio
| 
| Kevin Durant (37)
| Steven Adams (11)
| Russell Westbrook (12)
| Chesapeake Energy Arena18,203
| 4–2

|- style="background:#cfc;"
| 1
| May 16
| @ Golden State
| 
| Russell Westbrook (27)
| Steven Adams (12)
| Russell Westbrook (12)
| Oracle Arena19,596
|1–0
|- style="background:#fcc;"
| 2
| May 18 
| @ Golden State
| 
| Kevin Durant (29)
| Steven Adams (10)
| Russell Westbrook (12)
| Oracle Arena19,596
| 1–1
|- style="background:#cfc;"
| 3
| May 22 
| Golden State
| 
| Kevin Durant (33)
| Enes Kanter (9)
| Russell Westbrook (12)
| Chesapeake Energy Arena18,203
| 2–1
|- style="background:#cfc;"
| 4
| May 24 
| Golden State
| 
| Russell Westbrook (36)
| Andre Roberson (12)
| Russell Westbrook (11)
| Chesapeake Energy Arena18,203
| 3–1
|- style="background:#fcc;"
| 5
| May 26
| @ Golden State
| 
| Kevin Durant (40)
| Steven Adams (10)
| Russell Westbrook (8)
| Oracle Arena19,596
| 3–2
|- style="background:#fcc;"
| 6
| May 28
| Golden State
| 
| Kevin Durant (29)
| Ibaka, Adams & Westbrook (9)
| Russell Westbrook (11)
| Chesapeake Energy Arena18,203
| 3–3
|- style="background:#fcc;"
| 7
| May 30
| @ Golden State
| 
| Kevin Durant (27)
| Andre Roberson (12)
| Russell Westbrook (13)
| Oracle Arena19,596
| 3–4

Player statistics

Regular season

 Led team in statistic
After all games.
‡ Waived during the season
† Traded during the season
≠ Acquired during the season

Playoffs

 Led team in statistic
After all games.

Individual game highs

Awards and records

Awards

Records
After a win against the Denver Nuggets on November 1, 2015, the Thunder won their first three games for the first time since the 2011-12 season.
On December 3, 2015, the Thunder did not attempt a single three-pointer in the first quarter, the first time that happened this season.
On December 27, 2015, Kevin Durant and Russell Westbrook became the first teammates since John Stockton and Karl Malone to record at least 25 points and 10 assists in a regulation game. Durant had 26 points and 10 assists while Westbrook had 30 points and 12 assists against the Denver Nuggets.
On January 20, 2016, Westbrook became the fourth player to record at least 15 points, 15 assists, five rebounds and five steals in a game against the Charlotte Hornets.
On February 3, 2016, Westbrook recorded a career high 19 rebounds, the most by a point guard since Jason Kidd in 2007.
On February 3, 2016, Durant moved into 91st place on the NBA's all-time scoring list passing Latrell Sprewell with 16,744 points.
On March 9, 2016, Westbrook recorded 25 points, a career high 20 assists and 11 rebounds becoming the first player since Magic Johnson to have a triple-double with at least 25 points, 20 assists, and 10 rebounds since 1988. It also was the first triple-double with at least 20 points and 20 assists since Rod Strickland in 1998.
On March 18, 2016, Westbrook's 13th triple double of the season ties Grant Hill and Jason Kidd for most in a season over the last 25 years.
On March 22, 2016, Westbrook had his sixth triple double in March, the most in a calendar month since Michael Jordan with seven in April 1989.
On March 22, 2016, Durant moved into 81st place on the NBA's all-time scoring list passing Michael Finley with 17,326 points.
On March 28, 2016, Durant moved into 79th place on the NBA's all-time scoring list passing Steve Nash with 17,387 points.
On March 28, 2016, Durant and Westbrook extended their NBA single-season record for most games with at least 20 points, five rebounds and five assists by a pair of teammates to 22 times.
On April 6, 2016, Enes Kanter recorded the first 30-point, 20-rebound game in Thunder history. Kanter finished with 33 points, 20 rebounds against the Portland Trail Blazers.
On April 11, 2016, Westbrook recorded a triple-double before halftime since it began keeping track since the 2002-03 season. Westbrook finished the first half with 11 points, 10 rebounds and 10 assists.
On April 16, 2016, the Thunder's 108-70, 38 point win against the Dallas Mavericks was its largest victory margin in a playoff game since moving from Seattle as well as the lowest point total allowed in Seattle or Oklahoma City.

Injuries

Transactions

Overview

Trades

Free agency

Re-signed

Additions

Subtractions

References

Oklahoma City Thunder seasons
Oklahoma City Thunder
2015 in sports in Oklahoma
2016 in sports in Oklahoma